The Barda is a river in Perm Krai, Russia, a right tributary of Sylva. The source of the river is west of Kyn railway station. The Barda flows through Lysvensky urban okrug, Beryozovsky District and Kishertsky District of the krai and flows into the Sylva  from its mouth. Main tributaries: Tersi, Asovka (left); Kamenka (right).

References 

Rivers of Perm Krai